is a former Japanese football player.

Playing career
Yanagisawa was born in Yokohama on August 27, 1979. After graduating from Hosei University, he joined J1 League club Tokyo Verdy in 2002. He became a regular right side back from summer 2002. However his opportunity to play decreased from 2004 and Verdy was relegated to J2 League end of 2005 season. In 2007, he moved to Cerezo Osaka. He played as regular right side back in 2 seasons. In 2009, he moved to Sagan Tosu. In 2010, he moved to Sagan Tosu and played as regular player. In 2011, he moved to Yokohama FC. Although he played as regular player in 2011, his opportunity to play decreased in 2012 and he retired end of 2012 season.

Club statistics

References

External links

1979 births
Living people
Hosei University alumni
Association football people from Kanagawa Prefecture
Japanese footballers
J1 League players
J2 League players
Tokyo Verdy players
Cerezo Osaka players
Sagan Tosu players
Yokohama FC players
Association football defenders